Dark Side of Black is the fifth studio album by American heavy metal band Texas Hippie Coalition. It was released on April 22, 2016, via Carved Records.

Track listing

Personnel
Credits are adapted from the album's liner notes.

Texas Hippie Coalition
 Big Dad Ritch − vocals
 John Exall − bass
 Cord Pool − guitars
 Timmy Braun − drums

Production
 Sterling Winfield − producer, engineering, mixing
 Brad Blackwood − mastering
 Jason Harter − design
 Drift Markus − photography

Charts

References 

Texas Hippie Coalition albums
2016 albums